Harry Kane (born 1993) is an English professional footballer.

Harry Kane may also refer to:

Harry Kane (baseball) (1883–1932), American baseball player
Harry Kane (hurdler) (born 1933), British hurdler
Harry Kane (illustrator) (1912–1988), American illustrator and artist, born Harry Kirchner
Harry Kane (politician) (1903–1962), Australian politician
 Harry Kane, character in Harold Pinter's 1961 play The Collection 
 The real name of a fictional sniper from Marvel Comics, nicknamed "Hurricane"

See also
Harry P. Cain (1906–1979), US Senator from Washington state
Harry Cane of 1667, a 17th century hurricane